Mads Burnell (born March 6, 1994) is a Danish mixed martial artist who competes in featherweight division of Bellator MMA. Professional mixed martial artist since 2013, Burnell has also competed in the Ultimate Fighting Championship (UFC) and Cage Warriors, where he was a Featherweight champion. He was the 
European Championship (Brazilian jiu-jitsu) European No-Gi Champion in 2014. As of October 4, 2022, he is #6 in the Bellator Featherweight Rankings.

Mixed martial arts career

Early career 

Burnell started his professional MMA career in 2013 and won his first five bouts and met his first defeat when he faced Ott Tonissaar at Octagon Athletes 2. He fought all this fights in Northern Europe and amassed a record of 8–1 prior joining UFC.

Ultimate Fighting Championship 

Burnell made his promotional debut on September 2, 2017, facing  Michel Prazeres, replacing Islam Makhachev at UFC Fight Night: Volkov vs. Struve." At the weigh ins, Prazeres missed the lightweight limit of 156 pounds, coming in at 159 pounds. As a result the bout was changed to a catchweight and Prazeres was fined 20% of his purse. He lost the fight via submission due to a north-south choke in the third round. 

His second fight came against Mike Santiago on January 14, 2018, at UFC Fight Night: Stephens vs. Choi.  He won the fight via unanimous decision.

On May 27, 2018, Burnell faced Arnold Allen at UFC Fight Night: Thompson vs. Till. After dominating most of the fight, he was caught in a front naked choke in the third round and lost the fight.

On September 7, 2018, Burnell was released from UFC.

Cage Warriors
On September 7, 2018, news surfaced that Burnell had signed a contract with Cage Warriors. Burnell made his promotional debut against Lukasz Rajewski at Cage Warriors 99 on November 17, 2018. After weathering the early storm from Rajewski, Burnell took the fight to the ground and finished the fight via rear-naked choke in the first round.

Burnell challenged Dean Trueman for the Cage Warriors featherweight title at Cage Warriors 106 on June 29, 2019. Burnell submitted Trueman by japanese necktie in the second round and captured the featherweight championship.

Burnell was expected to make his first title defense against Steve Aimable at Cage Warriors London on November 22, 2019. However, Aimable could not make championship weight and the fight was changed to non-title bout. Burnell won the fight via unanimous decision.

Bellator MMA
On August 4, 2020, news surfaced that Burnell had signed a contract with Bellator.

Burnell made his debut on October 10, 2020, at Bellator 248. He faced Darko Banovic and won the fight via TKO in the first round.

Burnell was scheduled to face The Ultimate Fighter: Team McGregor vs. Team Faber standout Saul Rogers on April 2, 2021, at Bellator 255. However, the bout was cancelled due to visa issues. It eventually took place on April 16, 2021, at Bellator 257. Burnell won the bout via second round rear-naked choke.

Burnell faced Emmanuel Sanchez at Bellator 263 on July 31, 2021. He won the bout via unanimous decision.

On September 22, 2021, it was announced that Burnell had signed a new, multi-fight contract with Bellator.

Burnell headlined against Ádám Borics on March 12, 2022, at Bellator 276. He lost the bout via unanimous decision.

Burnell faced Pedro Carvalho on September 23, 2022, at Bellator 285. He lost the bout via unanimous decision.

Burnell is scheduled to face Justin Gonzales on April 22, 2023 at Bellator 295.

Championships and accomplishments

Mixed martial arts
Cage Warriors Fighting Championship
CWFC Featherweight Championship (One time)
Scottish Organisation of Mixed Martial Arts
SOMMA Featherweight Championship (One time)
MMAJunkie.com
2019 June Submission of the Month vs. Dean Trueman
Nordic MMA Awards - MMAviking.com
2017 Submission of the Year vs. Fernando Duarte

Grappling
European Championship (Brazilian jiu-jitsu)
European No-Gi Champion 2014

Mixed martial arts record 

|-
|Loss
|align=center|16–5 
|Pedro Carvalho
|Decision (unanimous)
|Bellator 285
|
|align=center|3
|align=center|5:00
|Dublin, Ireland
|
|-
| Loss
| align=center|16–4
| Ádám Borics
| Decision (unanimous)
| Bellator 276
| 
| align=center| 5
| align=center| 5:00
| St. Louis, Missouri, United States
|
|-
|Win
|align=center|16–3
|Emmanuel Sanchez
|Decision (unanimous)
|Bellator 263
|
|align=center|3
|align=center|5:00
|Los Angeles, California, United States
|
|-
|Win
|align=center|15–3
|Saul Rogers
|Submission (rear-naked choke)
|Bellator 257
|
|align=center|2
|align=center|4:08
|Uncasville, Connecticut, United States 
|
|-
|Win
|align=center|14–3
|Darko Banovic
|TKO (punches)
|Bellator 248
|
|align=center|1
|align=center|3:13
|Paris, France
|
|-
|Win
|align=center|13–3
|Steve Aimable
| Decision (unanimous)
|Cage Warriors 111
|
|align=center|3
|align=center|5:00
|London, England
|
|-
|Win
| align=center|12–3
| Dean Trueman
| Submission (Japanese necktie)
| Cage Warriors 106
| 
| align=center| 2
| align=center| 3:04
| London, England
|
|-
|Win
| align=center|11–3
| Ahmed Vila
| Submission (Japanese necktie)
| Cage Warriors 103
| 
| align=center| 1
| align=center| 0:50
| Copenhagen, Denmark
|
|-
|Win
| align=center|10–3
| Lukasz Rajewski
| Submission (rear-naked choke)
| Cage Warriors 99
| 
| align=center| 1
| align=center| 3:23
| Essex, England
|
|-
|Loss
| align=center| 9–3
| Arnold Allen
| Submission (front choke)
| UFC Fight Night: Thompson vs. Till
| 
| align=center| 3
| align=center| 2:41
| Liverpool, England
|
|-
| Win
| align=center| 9–2
| Mike Santiago 
| Decision (unanimous)
| UFC Fight Night: Stephens vs. Choi
| 
| align=center| 3
| align=center| 5:00
| St. Louis, Missouri, United States
|
|-
|Loss
| align=center| 8–2
| Michel Prazeres
| Submission (north-south choke)
| UFC Fight Night: Volkov vs. Struve
| 
| align=center| 3
| align=center| 1:26
| Rotterdam, Netherlands
|
|-
| Win
| align=center| 8–1
| Fernando Duarte Bagordache
| Submission (Japanese necktie)
| Scottish Organisation of MMA 2
| 
| align=center| 1
| align=center| 1:21
| Glasgow, Scotland
|
|-
| Win
| align=center| 7–1
| Anthony Riggio
| Submission (Japanese necktie)
| MMA Galla: Gonzalez vs. Djursaa
| 
| align=center| 1
| align=center| N/A
| Odense, Denmark
|
|-
| Win
| align=center| 6–1
| Emerik Youmbi
| Decision (unanimous)
| ICE Fighting Championships 12
| 
| align=center| 3
| align=center| 5:00
| Newcastle, England
|
|-
|Loss
| align=center| 5–1
| Ott Tonissaar
| TKO (punches)
| Octagon Athletes 2
| 
| align=center| 2
| align=center| 0:00
| Torebyhallen, Denmark
|
|-
| Win
| align=center| 5–0
| Hyram Rodriguez
| Decision (unanimous)
| Battle of Copenhagen: Reunion
| 
| align=center| 3
| align=center| 5:00
| Copenhagen, Denmark
|
|-
| Win
| align=center| 4–0
| Jamie Reynolds
| Submission (armbar)
| Odense Fight Night 3
| 
| align=center| 1
| align=center| 0:30
| Copenhagen, Denmark
|
|-
| Win
| align=center| 3–0
| Nasir Aoubi
| Decision (unanimous)
| Trophy MMA 4: Summerbreak
| 
| align=center| 3
| align=center| 5:00
| Malmö, Sweden
|
|-
| Win
| align=center| 2–0
| Ali Selcuk Ayin
| Submission (brabo choke)
| European MMA 8
| 
| align=center| 1
| align=center| 0:50
| Brondby, Denmark
|
|-
| Win
| align=center| 1–0
| Aleksander Sredanovic
| Submission (d'arce choke)
| European MMA 6
| 
| align=center| 1
| align=center| N/A
| Brondby, Denmark
|
|-

See also 
 List of current Bellator fighters 
 List of male mixed martial artists

References

External links 
 
 

Living people
1994 births
Danish male mixed martial artists
Featherweight mixed martial artists
Mixed martial artists utilizing Brazilian jiu-jitsu
Ultimate Fighting Championship male fighters
Danish practitioners of Brazilian jiu-jitsu
People awarded a black belt in Brazilian jiu-jitsu
Sportspeople from Copenhagen